Giovanni Pietro Volpi (15 May 1585 – 12 September 1636) was a Roman Catholic prelate who served as Bishop of Novara (1629–1636), Titular Bishop of Salona (1622–1629), and Auxiliary Bishop of Novara (1622–1629).

Biography
Giovanni Pietro Volpi was born in Como, Italy on 15 May 1585.
Volpi served as Canon of the Cathedral of Como. On 23 May 1622, he was appointed during the papacy of Pope Gregory XV as Auxiliary Bishop of Novara and Titular Bishop of Salona.
On 12 June 1622, he was consecrated bishop by Ludovico Ludovisi, Archbishop of Bologna with Galeazzo Sanvitale, Archbishop Emeritus of Bari-Canosa, and Ulpiano Volpi, Bishop of Novara, serving as co-consecrators. 
On 26 July 1624, he was appointed during the papacy of Pope Urban VIII as Coadjutor Bishop of Novara which was held at the time by his uncle, Ulpiano Volpi, who had duties in the Roman Curia. He succeeded to the bishopric on 10 March 1629.
He served as Bishop of Novara until his death on 12 September 1636.

References

External links and additional sources
 (for Chronology of Bishops) 
 (for Chronology of Bishops) 
 (for Chronology of Bishops) 
 (for Chronology of Bishops) 

17th-century Italian Roman Catholic bishops
Bishops appointed by Pope Gregory XV
Bishops appointed by Pope Urban VIII
1585 births
1636 deaths